A Princess of the Blood is a 1916 British silent film directed by Wilfred Noy.

Cast
 Barbara Conrad
 Harry Welchman

References

Bibliography
 Denis Gifford. The Illustrated Who's Who in British Films. B.T. Batsford, 1978.

External links

1916 films
Films directed by Wilfred Noy
British silent feature films
British black-and-white films
1910s English-language films